Anjali is a 2006 Indian Tamil-language soap opera starring Mallika, Prajin, Devadarshini, Poovilangu Mohan, Subhalekha Sudhakar, Devipriya and Rindhiya. It aired on Sun TV from 27 November 2006 to 25 April 2008 for 358 episodes. The show is produced by Aniksha Productions Anitha Kumaran and director by C.J.Bhaskar, title track was composed by Kiran and Lyrics by Vairamuthu. It was also aired in Sri Lanka Tamil Channel on Shakthi TV.

Plot
The story revolved around the girl Anjali. She was a girl who was brought up from a rather poor family. Ashok was a rich guy who fell in love with Anjali. He was very adamant and at point of time, he succeeded in marrying her. Anjali's father was happy that a rich guy had married his daughter. He was also the son of his employer. Ashok's dad I was not so happy in this marriage, but he accepted for the sake of his son's happiness. After their marriage, Anjali moved into Ashok's house and one day end up seeing Ashok's father strangling his sister. The story took a turn, when Anjali knew that a girl was after Ashok and the mystery about the girl she was having. Anjali was shocked about this. The rest of the story was about her finding the truth and about the way Ashok dealt with the situation. The serial was watched by the audience with interest and they were curious about the turns and twists. The suspense was about the connection between Ashok and the child. The story was knitted in a such way that it made the viewers remain astonished at the end of every episode.

Cast

Main cast
 Mallika as Anjali
 Prajin as Ashok
 Prajin as Subramani

Recurring cast
Deepa Venkat as Sathya
 Devi Priya as Ganga
 Vanaja as Kaveri
 Ammu Krishnan as Thilaka
 O.A.K. Sundar as Jeeva
 Poovilangu Mohan as Chakravarthy
 Rindhiya as Yamuna
 Pollachi Babu as Babu
 Vandhana as Roja 
 Brinda Das as Nalini
 Supriya as Shreenithi
 Devadarshini
 Usha 
 Siva 
 Siva Kavitha
 Subhalekha Sudhakar 
 Sathish
 Bhuvana
 Vijay Anand
 Polachi Babu
 Kamalaesh
 Priya Dharsini
 Gowthami Vembunathan
 Ajay Ghosh
 Lakshmi Vasudevan
 Dev Anand
 Sonia Bose
 A.E.Manoharan
 Kambar Jeyaraman
 Mappillai Ganesh
 Easter
 Nagalakshmi
 Premi
 Peeli Sivam
 B.R.Ilavarasan

External links
 Official Website 

Sun TV original programming
2006 Tamil-language television series debuts
2000s Tamil-language television series
2008 Tamil-language television series endings
Tamil-language television shows